Bianca van den Hoek (born 28 July 1976) is a Dutch racing cyclist.

See also
 2014 Parkhotel Valkenburg Continental Team season

References

External links

1976 births
Living people
Dutch female cyclists
People from Soest, Netherlands
Cyclists from Utrecht (province)
21st-century Dutch women